Arthur Allsopp (1 March 1908 – 6 February 1993) was an Australian cricketer. He played five first-class cricket matches for Victoria between 1933 and 1935.

See also
 List of Victoria first-class cricketers
 List of New South Wales representative cricketers

References

External links
 

1908 births
1993 deaths
Australian cricketers
New South Wales cricketers
Victoria cricketers
People from the Central Tablelands
Cricketers from New South Wales